The Cerro Colorado Formation is a geological formation to the south of General Carrera Lake in Patagonia. Sedimentary rocks of the Cerro Colorado Formation deposited under shallow marine conditions.

See also

References 

Geologic formations of Chile
Lower Cretaceous Series of South America
Cretaceous Chile
Shallow marine deposits
Formations
Geology of Aysén Region